"Look at Me (I'm in Love)" is a 1975 single written by, Al Goodman, Walter Lee Morris, and Harry Milton Ray , and performed by The Moments. The Moments would later change their name to Ray, Goodman & Brown.

Background
According to the liner notes of The Moments' Greatest Hits album, the song's origins are in a conversation backstage prior to a show.  When being teased by members Al Goodman and Billy Brown about the glow he had, Harry Ray responded, "Look at me...i'm in love."

Chart performance
In the United States, the single went to number one on the soul chart for one week and peaked at number thirty-nine on the Billboard Hot 100. Outside the US, Look at Me (I'm in Love)" peaked at number forty-two in the UK.

References

1975 singles
The Moments songs
1975 songs